The de Beaumont Foundation is a charitable foundation in Bethesda, Maryland. It was created in 1998 by Pierre S. (Pete) de Beaumont, the founder of the Brookstone Company.

The foundation is led by Brian C. Castrucci, DrPH, MA, whose previous experience includes the Robert Wood Johnson Foundation, the Philadelphia Department of Health, the Texas Department of State Health, and the Georgia Department of Public Health.

Major Initiatives 
Public Health Workforce Interests and Needs Survey (PH WINS), a national survey of the state and local public health workforce
CityHealth, a rating of U.S. cities on health-related policies
PHRASES (Public Health Reaching Across Sectors)
BUILD Health Challenge
Practical Playbook
 BEAM (Building Expertise and Administration and Management), in partnership with the University of Miami

References 

Medical and health foundations in the United States
Organizations established in 1998
Charities based in Maryland